Eduardo Espinoza (born 9 January 1934) is a Bolivian footballer. He played in three matches for the Bolivia national football team in 1963. He was also part of Bolivia's squad that won the 1963 South American Championship.

References

External links
 

1934 births
Living people
Bolivian footballers
Bolivia international footballers
Place of birth missing (living people)
Association football defenders
C.D. Jorge Wilstermann players